John M. Chowning (born August 22, 1934 in Salem, New Jersey) is an American composer, musician, discoverer, and professor best known for his work at Stanford University, the founding of CCRMA - Center for Computer Research in Music and Acoustics in 1975 and his development of the digital implementation of FM synthesis and the digital sound spatialization while there.

Contribution
Chowning is known for having developed the FM synthesis algorithm in 1967. In FM (frequency modulation) synthesis, both the carrier frequency and the modulation frequency are within the audio band. In essence, the amplitude and frequency of one waveform modulates the frequency of another waveform producing a resultant waveform that can be periodic or non-periodic depending upon the ratio of the two frequencies.

Chowning's breakthrough allowed for simple—in terms of process—yet rich sounding timbres, which synthesized 'metal striking' or 'bell like' sounds, and which seemed incredibly similar to real percussion (Chowning was also a skilled percussionist). He spent six years turning his breakthrough into a system of musical importance and eventually was able to simulate a large number of musical sounds, including the singing voice.  In 1974, Stanford University licensed the discovery to Yamaha, with whom Chowning worked in developing a family of synthesizers and electronic organs.  This was Stanford's most lucrative patent at one time, eclipsing many in electronics, computer science, and biotechnology.

The first commercial musical instrument to incorporate FM synthesis was the Synclavier I, introduced by New England Digital Corporation in 1977. Their Synclavier II, introduced in 1980, was frequently used in the production of popular music beginning that year. The first Yamaha product to incorporate the FM algorithm was the GS1, a digital synthesizer that first shipped in 1981. Some thought, including Chowning, that it was too expensive at the time. Soon after, in 1983, Yamaha made their first commercially successful digital FM synthesizer, the DX7.

Another important aspect of Chowning's work is the simulated motion of sound through physical space. In 1972, in his composition Turenas, he was first able to create the illusion of a continuous 360-degree space using only four speakers.

Early life
Chowning graduated from Wittenberg University with a Bachelor of Music in 1959. He studied music composition for two years (1959–61) with Nadia Boulanger in Paris and received his D.M.A. in 1966 from Stanford, where he studied under Leland Smith. He was the founding director in 1975 of the Center for Computer Research in Music and Acoustics (CCRMA) at Stanford University.

Chowning also worked for a number of years at IRCAM, in Paris.

Private life
Chowning married Elisabeth Keller and they had two children, John and Marianne. John's second marriage is to Maureen (Doody) Tiernay and they had one child named James Scott.

Famous compositions
One of Chowning's most famous pieces is called Stria (1977). It was commissioned by IRCAM for the Institute's first major concert series called Perspectives of the 20th Century. His composition was noted for its inharmonic sounds due to his famous FM algorithm and his use of the golden mean (1.618...) in music.

Other famous compositions include Turenas (1972), which was one of the first electronic compositions to have the illusion of sounds moving in a 360-degree space. With Phoné (1980–1981), he became the first to put FM over voice synthesis.

Compositions
 Sabelithe, 1966, revised 1971
 Turenas, 1972
 Stria, 1977
 Phoné, 1980–1981
 Voices, 2005

See also
 CCRMA – Center for Computer Research in Music and Acoustics
 Frequency modulation synthesis

References

Works cited

Further reading
 John M. Chowning Papers
 Andrew Nelson, The Sound of Innovation, Cambridge MA, MIT Press, 2015
 Olivier Baudouin, Pionniers de la musique numérique, Sampzon, Delatour, 2012
 John Chowning. Portraits polychromes. P.A. Castanet, É. Gayou, J.C. Risset et al. (eds). Paris: Ina – Michel de Maule, 2005.
 Computer Music Journal (The Reconstruction of Stria), Computer Music Journal, Fall 2007, Vol. 31.
 Roads, C., “John Chowning on composition”, Composers and the computer. Los Altos CA: Kaufman, pp. 18–25, 1985. 
 Zelli, Bijan. “Interview with John Chowning.” [www.bijanzelli.com/Chowning_Interview_Published.pdf] (April 2010). Montréal: CEC.
 Zelli, Bijan. “Reale und virtuelle Räume in der Computermusik: Theorien, Systeme, Analysen.” Unpublished PhD dissertation. Kommunikations- und Geschichtswissenschaft, Technische Universität Berlin, 2001. Available on the author’s website, the dissertation includes an analysis of Turenas.

External links
 
 Chaiken, Alison and Ann Arbor. Interview with John Chowning (audio). 13 April 2006.
 Portraits Polychromes, John Chowning, INA (Institut National Audiovisuel).
 Interview with John Chowning (2015) charting a historical overview of the different branches of his artistic career, focusing on his interest in the human voice, the creation of new sonorities, and being a pioneer in a discipline at a time when using computers to generate music was a leap into the void between creative eccentricity and scientific adventure.
John Chowning talks about the importance of velocity sensitivity of the DX7 as well as the data cartridge to store voices – NAMM Oral History Library (2001)

American male classical composers
American classical composers
Experimental composers
1934 births
Living people
Wittenberg University alumni
20th-century classical composers
People from Salem, New Jersey
20th-century American composers
20th-century American male musicians